Bert Herbert Frank Holmes (27 September 1924 — November 2003) was an English footballer who played as a centre half.

Career
Holmes signed for hometown club Norwich City in 1947, following stints playing football for local clubs Norman Old Boys and Gothic. Holmes made 58 Football League appearances, scoring once, during his time at the club in a 4–2 win against Torquay United. In 1956 Holmes signed for Chelmsford City, where he spent two seasons before moving to Clacton Town.

References

1924 births
2003 deaths
Association football defenders
English footballers
Footballers from Norwich
Norwich City F.C. players
Chelmsford City F.C. players
F.C. Clacton players
English Football League players
Southern Football League players
Gothic F.C. players